Beaver Meadow Pond is a small lake northwest of Readburn in Delaware County, New York. It drains southwest via Dry Brook, which flows into Read Creek. Hawk Mountain is located southwest of Beaver Meadow Pond.

See also
 List of lakes in New York

References 

Lakes of New York (state)
Lakes of Delaware County, New York